Mark Braud (born June 21, 1973) is an American jazz trumpeter and band leader, who is a current leader of the Preservation Hall Jazz Band's New Orleans band, and Mark Braud's Jazz Giants. He has been a sideman for dozens of groups including Harry Connick, Jr., Dr. Michael White's Original Liberty Jazz Band, Henry Butler, and R&B singer Eddie Bo.

Biography

Braud began playing up the trumpet at age twelve. He comes from a long line of New Orleans musicians.  He is the grandson of legendary trumpeter John "Picket" Brunious, Sr., and the nephew of jazz trumpeters and Preservation Hall Jazz Band leaders Wendell Brunious and John Brunious, Jr.. Braud is also a distant relative of Duke Ellington Orchestra bassist Wellman Braud and the Santiago family. He began playing the trumpet at age of twelve. He was a student of the New Orleans Center for Creative Arts. He majored in jazz studies at the University of New Orleans.  While studying there, he was chosen for the school's annual European tour.

Career highlights
 2010  Preservation Hall Jazz Band (Current Member).
 2001  Harry Connick Jr. Big Band (Current Member).
 2002  "One Mo' Time" - Broadway Musical

As leader

 Preservation Hall Jazz Band - New Orleans Unit. Took over the job from his uncle, trumpeter Wendell Brunious.
 Mark Braud's Jazz Giants
 The Basin Street Brass Band

As sideman

Braud has appeared with numerous artists as a sideman:

Wynton Marsalis
Eddie Bo
Dr. Michael White
Harry Connick Jr.
Lars Edigren

References

Preservation Hall Jazz Band Biography
Mark Braud website

1973 births
Living people
American jazz trumpeters
American male trumpeters
21st-century trumpeters
21st-century American male musicians
American male jazz musicians